The 2020 Illinois Fighting Illini football team represented the University of Illinois at Urbana–Champaign in the 2020 NCAA Division I FBS football season. The Fighting Illini played their home games at Memorial Stadium in Champaign, Illinois, and competed in the West Division of the Big Ten Conference. They were led by fifth-year head coach Lovie Smith.

On July 9, 2020, the Big Ten announced that member teams will only play conference games in effort to reduce issues related to the ongoing COVID-19 pandemic. On August 11, the Big Ten canceled the college football season for the fall of 2020 due to the continuing COVID-19 pandemic. On September 16, the Big Ten reinstated the season, announcing an eight-game season beginning on October 24.

Prior to the team's final game, Smith was relieved of his coaching duties. The team finished the season with a record of 2–6.

Schedule
Illinois had games scheduled against Illinois State, UConn, and Bowling Green, but canceled these games on July 9 due to the Big Ten Conference's decision to play a conference-only schedule due to the COVID-19 pandemic.

Players drafted into the NFL

References

Illinois
Illinois Fighting Illini football seasons
Illinois Fighting Illini football